Richard Bruce Reid (born 3 December 1958) is a former New Zealand international cricketer, who played nine One Day Internationals between 1988 and 1991. His father, John Reid, played Test cricket for New Zealand from 1949 to 1965.

Reid was born in Lower Hutt, Wellington. He attended Scots College, Wellington, where he captained the first XI. He later became a cricket and rugby administrator.

References

External links

1958 births
Living people
New Zealand One Day International cricketers
New Zealand cricketers
Auckland cricketers
Gauteng cricketers
Wellington cricketers
Cricketers from Lower Hutt
People educated at Scots College, Wellington